Adam Jakub Kopczyński (2 August 1948 – 8 February 2021) was a Polish ice hockey player. He played for Cracovia and ŁKS Łódź during his career. He also played for the Polish national team at the 1972 Winter Olympics and multiple World Championships. After retiring in 1980, Kopczyński moved to Belgium where he coached local teams.

He died from COVID-19 during the COVID-19 pandemic in Poland.

References

External links
 
 
 
 
 

1948 births
2021 deaths
Ice hockey players at the 1972 Winter Olympics
MKS Cracovia (ice hockey) players
Olympic ice hockey players of Poland
Polish emigrants to Belgium
Polish ice hockey coaches
Polish ice hockey forwards
Sportspeople from Kraków
Deaths from the COVID-19 pandemic in Poland